Aron Brand-Auraban (21 February 1910 – 22 April 1977) was an Israeli pediatric cardiologist. He served as chairman of the Israel Medical Association in Jerusalem, and founded the Jerusalem Academy of Medicine.

Biography
Aron Brand grew up in Koło, where he attended heder and the Jewish gymnasium. His father, Natan, was a grain merchant and miller. In 1925, his father, a fervent Zionist, sent him to Palestine to study at Gymnasia Herzliya in Tel Aviv. In 1928, he studied philosophy and Jewish studies in Berlin. He studied simultaneously at the University of Berlin and the Hochschule fuer die Wissenschaft des Judentums. One of his classmates at the Hochschule was Abraham Joshua Heschel.

In 1935, Brand completed his doctoral thesis in the Friedrich-Wilhelms University of Berlin.

In the summer of 1939, Brand returned to Poland and married Esther Malka (Mala) née Aurbach, of Przedecz. By a stroke of luck, they left Poland one day before the Nazis invaded. At the time, Brand was a teacher at the Ma'aleh School in Jerusalem. The couple had three sons, Avraham, Natan and Haim.

Medical career
In 1955, Brand founded the Jerusalem Academy of Medicine. From 1964 until his death, he headed the Pediatric Department of Bikur Cholim Hospital in Jerusalem. He was the founder of the Israel Institute for Medical History and a fellow of the American Academy of Pediatrics. In 1969-1970, he was a visiting associate professor of pediatrics at Harvard College in Boston, Massachusetts.

Brand published numerous articles on medicine, philosophy, literature and art, and organized hundreds of lectures and workshops open to the general public on health-related issues. In 1976, he was awarded the Henrietta Szold Prize for his contribution to public health.

Commemoration
Rehov Aron Brand, a street in the Har Nof neighborhood of Jerusalem, is named after him.

Published works
Mechanik von Ventilbildungen an den Brustorganen in ihren Beziehungen zum Pneumothorax. Thesis (doctoral)- Friedrich-Wilhelms-Universität zu Berlin, 1935 (In German)
The effect of added corticosteroids on the rates of recovery from beta-hemolytic streptococci in children with rheumatic fever under penicillin prophylaxis, Clinical Pediatrics,, vol. 16, 9
Some Observations on the Epidemic of Asian Influenza in Jerusalem. International record of medicine, Volume 172, Hermes Press, 1959. p. 101
Polygot medical pocket dictionary. ha-Aḳademyah li-refuʼah bi-Yerushalayim, 1976. 308 pp.
Physical culture and medicine.. Wingate Institute. 1976. 104 pp.
The Mysterious Illness of Moses Mendelssohn, Koroth, 6:7-8 (1974), pp.421-426

See also
List of Polish Jews
Healthcare in Israel

References

1910 births
1977 deaths
Polish emigrants to Mandatory Palestine
Harvard University staff
Israeli pediatricians
Israeli cardiologists
Herzliya Hebrew Gymnasium alumni
Pediatric cardiologists
19th-century Polish Jews
People from Ozorków
People from Koło County
Hochschule für die Wissenschaft des Judentums alumni